Mehmet Hilmi Güler (born 15 July 1946) is a Turkish politician and metallurgical engineer. He was the Energy and Natural Resources Minister of Turkey in 2002–2009. He served as the general director of the Machines and Chemical Industries Board (MKEK) and Etibank. He was a founding member of the currently ruling AKP.

Education
Güler graduated from the Department of Metallurgy at the Middle East Technical University and worked as a project engineer and group chairman at TUSAŞ Aerospace Industries (TAİ). He went on to an academic career as deputy chairman of the Scientific and Technological Research Council of Turkey (TÜBİTAK).

Political career
As energy minister as well as the day-to-day running of this important department dealing with Turkey's gas, electricity requirements he has had to deal with a number of issues including:
 Privatisation of Turkey's energy sector
 Enquiries into the corruption allegations against the previous (ANAP) government concerning the deal it made to purchase natural gas from Russia, the Blue Stream agreement.
 Negotiating other natural gas purchases with countries including Iran.
 Plans, sponsored by Güler, to build three nuclear power stations in Turkey.
 Continued oil exploration and investment in hydro-electric power.
 A strategy for the mining of boron, of which Turkey is the world's largest producer

Personal life
He is married and has two children.

References
 Biography of Mehmet Hilmi Güler at Who is who database

External links

 

Living people
1946 births
Justice and Development Party (Turkey) politicians
Government ministers of Turkey
Ministers of Energy and Natural Resources of Turkey
Members of the 23rd Parliament of Turkey
Members of the 22nd Parliament of Turkey
Members of the 60th government of Turkey